Tale of the Troika (Сказка о Тройке) is a 1968 satirical science fiction novel  by Russian writers Boris and Arkady Strugatsky, with illustrations by Yevgeniy Migunov. It criticises both Soviet bureaucracy and somewhat the Soviet scientific environment. Although the novel itself is not directed against state per se and a number of points underlined are true of modern-day bureaucracy and science, it met with a cold reaction during Soviet times and was quite difficult to obtain, therefore achieving a "forbidden fruit" status.

The novel exists in two slightly different variants - Smena and Angara, by the names of the magazines in which they were published. They differ by characters and some plot lines and was caused by Angara editorial request to fit the novel for the magazine volume. 

One version can be considered a more direct sequel to Monday Begins on Saturday, at the end of which the main character is told he will be sent to Kitezhgrad for a business trip, and that is where this version of Tale of the Troika takes place. The other version takes place in Tmuskorpion' (literally: "darkness-scorpion", a pun with "Tmutarakan", which is a cliché for a remote, obscure place; tarakan means cockroach, hence the pun, and "tmu-" comes from the word "t'ma", here meaning "a large number of"), on a previously unexplored and unreachable floor of the Scientific Research Institute of Sorcery and Wizardry.

External links
"Before and After the 'Tale'..."  
https://archive.org/details/ArkadyBorisStrugatskyTaleOfTheTroika English book at the Internet Archive

1968 novels
Novels by Arkady and Boris Strugatsky
Bureaucracy in fiction